The Book of the Resurrection of Jesus Christ, by Bartholomew the Apostle is a pseudonymous work of the New Testament apocrypha. It is not to be confused with the book called Questions of Bartholomew and either text may be identical with the lost Gospel of Bartholomew.  It is considered to have been written in the 8th or 9th century, although the exact date is uncertain.

Sources
The text is known from three partial manuscripts, and additional fragments, all of which are in Coptic. The text contains visions by Bartholomew, and acts of Thomas, but is predominantly about The Passion, and the Eucharist. The text seems to have no semblance of gnostic interpretations, and instead appears to be a text aiming to fill in the supernatural details of the Passion, and to emphasise the value and meaning of church liturgy.

Contents
The text starts with a description of Jesus' own comprehension of his own fate, i.e. the crucifixion. It is followed by a tale in which someone attempts to stand in for Jesus (i.e. die in his place), but the priests are initially unable to kill him, even though they try stoning and putting him in an oven.

Subsequently, the text describes Jesus descending into hell, finding Judas Iscariot there, and preaching to him. Jesus then rescues everyone from hell, except for Judas, Cain, and Herod the Great. This is followed by a flashback described by a gardener to the night when angels, fiery chariots, and God, descended to earth, and resurrected Jesus.

Bartholomew is present at the scene, and is shown the highest level of heaven so that he can see the liturgy going on there to celebrate the resurrection. Bartholomew then has a flashback about a divine visitation at the Mount of Olives.

Meanwhile, Thomas is busy resurrecting Siophanes (possibly a transcription error and meant to read Theophanes), his son. On returning to life, Siophanes describes what the afterlife was like, while Thomas proceeds to baptise all of the amazed townsfolk, who number some 12,000.

Finally, in order to witness the ascension of Jesus, Thomas is brought to the others via a cloud. At this point Thomas is surprised to see Jesus resurrected (despite having just brought his own son back to life), and celebrates the eucharist with the other apostles. Then they disperse to evangelise.

External links
 Coptic Apocrypha in the dialect of Upper Egypt - pp. 14 ff.
 Book of Bartholomew at NASSCAL

Passion Gospels
8th-century Christian texts

pt:Evangelho de Bartolomeu